Isabel "Belle" Cobb (October 25, 1858 – August 11, 1947) was a Cherokee woman, physician and educator. Cobb is best known for being the first woman physician in Indian Territory.

Early life and education
Cobb was born near Morgantown, Tennessee and was the oldest of seven children of Joseph Benson and Evaline Clingman Cobb. She attended school in Cleveland, Tennessee until 1870, when at the age of 12, her family moved to Cooweescoowee District of the Cherokee Nation (near modern day Wagoner, Oklahoma).  Cobb was a good student, winning awards while attending school in Tennessee. This furthered her hunger for education and laid the groundwork for her ability to excel in future studies after her family moved to Indian Territory.  Shortly after arriving in the Cherokee Nation, her mother gave birth to Cobb's youngest sister. It was a very difficult delivery. The family had to call for a midwife because there were no doctors in the area at the time. Although her mother survived the delivery, it left a lasting impression on the young woman and became her motivation that would propel her into her career.

There was a limited choice of schools in the Indian Territory at the time so Cobb enrolled in the Cherokee Female Seminary in Tahlequah, Oklahoma where she graduated in 1879. She continued her education at Glendale Female College in Glendale, Ohio where she graduated in 1881. At this point in her life, Cobb had received more education than most women of her day. Cobb returned to Indian Territory to teach at the Seminary from 1882 until it was destroyed by fire in 1887. She never forgot the lesson she learned from watching her mother struggle during childbirth and the need for doctors in her district; so she left the territory again and enrolled in the Woman's Medical College of Pennsylvania in 1888. It was only the second institution in the world, at that time, to offer women a M.D. degree.  Cobb earned her M.D. degree in 1892.

Career
After Cobb spent six months in an internship in New York at Staten Island Nursery and Child's hospital, she again returned home, in 1893, to begin her practice of medicine in the rural areas of Wagoner County. She worked out of a farmhouse on her family's homestead, barely seeing two hundred patients per year.  She focused primarily on women and children. "Dr. Belle" as she was known, performed many surgeries inside the patient's home, traveling many miles in her horse-drawn buggy, and often refused to charge anything for her services.

Retirement, personal life and death

Cobb continued her practice until she fell and broke her hip in 1930. She retired soon after as her health deteriorated. Cobb never married, but she did adopt a six-year-old Italian orphan in 1895. She was a member of the Presbyterian church as well as many literary societies in Wagoner County. Cobb died from natural causes on August 11, 1947 in Wagoner and was laid to rest at Pioneer Memorial Cemetery.

Posthumous recognition
In 2015, students at Northeastern State University, which now sits on the land once occupied by the female and male Cherokee seminaries, voted to name the new student housing after Cobb. She received 43% of the 266 total votes cast. There is only one other building on campus named after a woman. Isabel Cobb Hall was dedicated in a ribbon cutting ceremony held September 19, 2016. On March 26, 2016, Mayor Albert Jones of Wagoner declared the day "Dr. Belle Cobb Day". There was an event at the Wagoner Historical Museum in which many of Cobb's relatives were in attendance. The declaration from the mayor read in part, "Today, we celebrate Dr. Belle Cobb and pay tribute to her outstanding leadership, perseverance and giving heart...the city of Wagoner honors and commemorates Dr. Cobb for making a definitive mark on history."

References

External links

1858 births
1947 deaths
19th-century American educators
19th-century American women educators
19th-century American physicians
19th-century American women physicians
20th-century American physicians
20th-century American women physicians
20th-century Native Americans
20th-century Native American women
Cherokee Nation academics
Cherokee Nation people (1794–1907)
Schoolteachers from Oklahoma
People from Wagoner County, Oklahoma
Physicians from Oklahoma
Educators from Oklahoma
People from Loudon County, Tennessee
Educators from Tennessee
Physicians from Tennessee
Woman's Medical College of Pennsylvania alumni